Harris and Me is a children's novel written by author Gary Paulsen. It was first published in 1993. The book is composed of a collection of vignettes with a subheading to preview each chapter. Based on a 2007 online poll, the National Education Association listed the book as one of its "Teachers' Top 100 Books for Children."

Plot summary

Characters
The "Me" of the title is an eleven-year-old boy who narrates the story. Since "Harris and Me" is a memoir of Gary Paulsen's childhood, The "Me" is Gary Paulsen, Or at least in his point of view.
Harris Larson: A hyperactive nine-year-old boy who loves kinetic adventures.
Knute Larson: Harris's father, a coffee-guzzling farmer who almost never speaks.
Louie: A farmhand on the Larson's place, who sleeps above the barn. He has no teeth and swallows his food without chewing. He also has a hobby of making small wooden sculptures, including a wooden hand sized bust of the main character in the memoir.
Glennis Larson: Harris's older sister, who repeatedly slaps Harris for swearing, which happens numerous times a day.
Clair Larson: Harris's mother, the cook of the family.
Buzzer: A lynx who was found and raised by Louie as a pet.
Ernie: An extremely aggressive rooster
Vivian: A big cow who doesn't like to be touched or milked. 
Bill and Bob: The Huge Horses
Note: This is a memoir of a summer in the life of Gary Paulsen. It is said that he never went back to visit Harris.

Motifs
Home life
Belonging
Family
Acceptance
Identity

References

 Juliane F. Gillispie and Robert M. Otten.  Harris and Me: A Summer Remembered: For Further Reference. Beacham's Guide to Literature for Young Adults. Ed. Kirk H. Beetz. Vol 7. Beacham-Gale, 1990. January 2005. 26 June 2008.
 Nile, Amber. Harris and Me. Secondary English. 19 June 2008.
 Paulsen, Gary.  Harris and Me.  Orlando:  Harcourt, Inc., 1993.

1993 American novels
American children's novels
Novels by Gary Paulsen
Novels set in Minnesota
1993 children's books